The 2013 Adelaide Thunderbirds season saw Adelaide Thunderbirds compete in the 2013 ANZ Championship. With a team  captained by Natalie von Bertouch and featuring Erin Bell, Carla Borrego, Renae Hallinan, Rebecca Bulley and Sharni Layton, Adelaide Thunderbirds won both the minor premiership and the overall championship. Having previously won the 2010 ANZ Championship, Thunderbirds became the first team to win a second championship.
Thunderbirds secured the minor premiership with a 64–48 win over Northern Mystics in Round 13. They subsequently defeated Melbourne Vixens 49–39 in the major semi-final and	Queensland Firebirds 50–48 in the grand final to win the championship.

Players

Player movements

2013 roster

Notes
  Laura Packard, Samantha Poolman and Stephanie Puopolo were also members of the 2013 Southern Force squad. 
  Kate Shimmin was also in the 2013 Australian Institute of Sport squad.

Milestones
 Erin Bell became the first player to win three ANZ Championship titles  She won her first title with the 2008 New South Wales Swifts and her second with the 2010 Adelaide Thunderbirds. 
 Natalie von Bertouch announced she was retiring as a player shortly after the grand final.

Melbourne Vixens Summer Challenge
The main pre-season event was the Summer Challenge, hosted by Melbourne Vixens at the State Netball Hockey Centre on 23 and 24 February.

Regular season

Fixtures and results
Round 1

Round 2

Round 3

Round 4

Round 5

Round 6

Round 7

Round 8

Round 9

Round 10

Round 11

Round 12
Adelaide Thunderbirds received a bye.
Round 13

Round 14

Final table

Finals

Major semi-final

Grand final

Award winners

ANZ Championship awards

Thunderbirds awards

All Stars

Australian Netball Awards

References

Adelaide Thunderbirds seasons
Adelaide Thunderbirds